Lodewicus Johannes du Plessis (1897-1968) was a South African academic, alternative Afrikaner political philosopher, and Calvinist.

Roots
He was born on 10 February 1897 in Burgersdorp, Cape Colony. He was the son of Jacobus Albertus du Plessis and Laurika Postma. He married Engela Susanna van der Merwe on 12 January 1926. He died on 19 February 1968 in Potchefstroom, Transvaal, South Africa.

Education
Du Plessis matriculated in 1912 from Potchefstroom Gimnasium. He received his BA, BA Hons (Classical languages) and MA (Classical languages) at the University of Pretoria. Later he also received a master's degree in Economics, as well as an LL.B. (law degree).

Career
In 1918 he started as a senior lecturer in Classical languages at The Theological Seminar of the Reformed Church (Afrikaans: Gereformeerde Kerke in Suid-Afrika) in Potchefstroom. After obtaining the economics and law qualifications, he was offered a professorship in economics, political science and ethics at the Potchefstroom University for Christian Higher Education. In later years he focused on law. He was secretary of the commission who translated the Bible in Afrikaans and was an advisor to Totius.

Calvinism
He was an alternative Calvinist, in the sense that he believed that only Calvinism is not the answer. He was open to a combination of Calvinism, Marxism and other possible beliefs.

Politics
He was actively participating in Afrikaner politics, although he never stood for office. He was chairman of the Afrikaner Broederbond from 1930-1932. He was not scared to differ from political leaders such as J.B.M. Hertzog, DF Malan and J. G. Strijdom. His biggest clash was with H.F. Verwoerd, which caused him to be expelled from the National Party. Then, he also left the Afrikaner Broederbond. He was not in favour of Verwoerd's racial policy and his definition of an Afrikaner.

References 

1897 births
1968 deaths
People from Burgersdorp
Cape Colony people
Afrikaner people
South African people of French descent
Members of the Reformed Churches in South Africa
Calvinist and Reformed philosophers
Academic staff of North-West University
University of Pretoria alumni